Oncocnemidinae is a subfamily of moths which belong to the large moth family (Noctuidae). In contrast to most other members of the family, they fly during the day. Oncocnemidinae are small, dark coloured moths, but the backs of their wings are generally white with broad, black stripes.

Systematic classification 
 Subfamily Oncocnemidinae
 Calophasia
Calophasia lunula (Hufnagel, 1766)
Sympistis Hübner, 1823
Sympistis funebris (Hübner, 1809)
Sympistis heliophila (Paykull, 1793)
Sympistis lapponica (Thunberg, 1791)
Sympistis nigrita (Boisduval, 1840)
Calliergis (Hübner, 1821)
Calliergis ramosa (Esper, 1786)
Stilbia (Stephens, 1829)
Stilbia anomala (Haworth, 1812)

References 
 Norges sommerfugler – Nattfly 
 Aarvik, L., Beggren, K. og Hansen, L.O. (2000) Catalogus Lepidopterorum Norvegiae. Lepidopterologisk Arbeidsgruppe/Nordk Institutt for Skogforskning. 
 Svenska Fjärilar, with picture gallery: 

Noctuidae
Moth subfamilies